Senerath Gunesekera Vidaneralalage Mahen Dias Gunasekera (born 29 March 1953) was a Sri Lankan lawyer and politician. He was elected from the Gampaha District from the United National Party to the Parliament of Sri Lanka in the 1989 general elections and served as Deputy Minister  of Justice. He was the third son of Bennet Gunasekera.

See also
List of political families in Sri Lanka

References

1953 births

Deputy ministers of Sri Lanka
Living people
Members of the 9th Parliament of Sri Lanka
Sinhalese lawyers
Sinhalese politicians
United National Party politicians